Andrew James Pennington  (1 February 1960 – 28 January 2000) was a British Liberal Democrat politician and a posthumous recipient of the George Medal in 2001.  He was a Gloucestershire County Councillor from 1985 until his death in a stabbing attack in 2000.

Background
Pennington lived in Cheltenham, Gloucestershire. He was elected as a Liberal to Gloucestershire County Council in the 1985 election, defeating the incumbent Labour councillor in the Hesters Way division with a majority of 183 votes. He was re-elected as a Liberal Democrat in 1989, and in 1993 held his seat with 73.3% of the vote.

Death
On 28 January 2000, Pennington was acting as an assistant to Nigel Jones, the Liberal Democrat Member of Parliament (MP) for Cheltenham, during Jones's constituency surgery. A constituent, Robert Ashman, whom Jones had been helping with legal disputes, attended the surgery and suddenly attacked Jones with a samurai sword. Pennington came to Jones's defence but was fatally injured; he was stabbed nine times from behind, with at least six of the wounds going all the way through his body. Jones was badly injured in the hands.

George Medal
Pennington was posthumously awarded the George Medal by Queen Elizabeth II on 30 October 2001. The citation reads:

Trial and aftermath
In February 2001, the suspect in Pennington's killing, 49-year-old Robert Ashman of Lansdown Place, Cheltenham, was initially charged with the murder of Pennington and the attempted murder of Jones, but the jury at Bristol Crown Court decided that he was mentally unfit to stand trial. After a three-day hearing, they returned a unanimous verdict that Ashman did kill Pennington and a majority verdict that he injured Jones. Ashman was sent to a secure hospital for an indefinite amount of time. The High Court judge said at the time that Ashman was so disturbed that "she could not foresee a time when he would be safely released."

Ashman was released in July 2008 after psychiatrists determined that he was no longer dangerous.  In 2009, he was living temporarily in Bristol and told authorities that he wished to move to Gloucester, close to where Jones and his family live.  Lord Jones raised concerns with Justice Secretary Jack Straw about the proposal.

References

1960 births
2000 deaths
Councillors in Gloucestershire
Recipients of the George Medal
People from Cheltenham
Liberal Democrats (UK) councillors
English murder victims
People murdered in England
Deaths by stabbing in England
Assassinated English politicians
Attacks on British politicians